Ensweiler Academy was a seven-year (6-12) alternative school of the Lake Ridge Schools Corporation in unincorporated Lake County, Indiana, United States.  It won the Indiana Exemplary Award for alternative schools in Indiana twice (2001 and 2003).  It accepted students from the Highland, Lake Ridge, Lake Central, and Whiting school districts.  Students were referred from their home school.  It closed at the end of the 2009–2010 school year.

References

External links 
Ensweiler Academy Official Site

Special needs schools in Indiana
Schools in Lake County, Indiana
Education in Gary, Indiana
Public high schools in Indiana
Public middle schools in Indiana
Alternative schools in the United States
Educational institutions disestablished in 2010